Maheshpur is a village in the Bamangola CD block in the Malda Sadar subdivision of  Malda district in the state of West Bengal, India.

Geography

Location

Area overview
The area shown in the adjacent map covers two physiographic regions – the Barind in the east and the tal in the west. The eastern part is comparatively high (up to 40 metres above mean sea level at places) and uneven. The soils of the eastern region are “hard salty clays of a reddish hue and the ground is baked hard as iron.” It lies to the east of the Mahananda River. The area lying to the west of the Mahananda River, the tal, is a flat low land and “is strewn with innumerable marshes, bils and oxbow lakes.” The tal area is prone to flooding by local rivers. The total area is overwhelmingly rural. There are two important historical/ archaeological sites in the area – Pandua and Jagjivanpur.

Note: The map alongside presents some of the notable locations in the area. All places marked in the map are linked in the larger full screen map.

Demographics
According to the 2011 Census of India, Maheshpur had a total population of 742, of which 389 (52%) were males and 353 (48%) were females. Population in the age range 0–6 years was 87. The total number of literate persons in  Maheshpur was 655 (66.16% of the population over 6 years).

Healthcare
Bamangola Rural Hospital, with 30 beds, at Maheshpur is a major government facility in Bamangola CD block.

References

Villages in Malda district